Events in the year 2023 in Norway.

Incumbents
 Monarch – Harald V
 President of the Storting – Masud Gharahkhani (Labour).
 Prime Minister – Jonas Gahr Støre (Labour).

Events

Sports 
2022–23 REMA 1000-ligaen (women's handball)
2023 World Women's Handball Championship

Deaths 

9 January – Magnar Mangersnes, organist and choral conductor (born 1938).
 11 January – Haakon Pedersen, 64, singer.
 13 January – 
 Odd Bergh, 85, athlete.
 Laila Mikkelsen, 82, film director (Little Ida, Oss) and producer (Nedtur).
 16 January – Bjarne Hansen, 93, footballer (Vålerenga, national team).
 24 January – Ole Didrik Lærum, 82, oncologist and academic administrator, rector of the University of Bergen (1990–1995).
 28 January – Odd Børre, 83, pop singer (Eurovision Song Contest 1968).
 11 February – Odd Eriksen, 67, politician, minister of trade and industry (2005–2006) and governor of Nordland (2006–2013).
 12 February – Arne Treholt, 80, politician and convicted spy.
16 February – Marie Borge Refsum, politician (born 1927).
 22 February – Ellen Inga O. Hætta, 69, politician.
24 February – Edith Roger, dancer, choreographer and stage director (born 1922).
9 March – Tanja Heiberg Storm, diplomat (born 1946).
15 March – Odd Hoftun, engineer and missionary (born 1927).

References

 
Norway
Norway
2020s in Norway
Years of the 21st century in Norway